Koga may refer to:

Places

Japan 
 Koga, Ibaraki (古河)
 Koga, Fukuoka (古賀)
 Koga Domain

Elsewhere
 Koga, a town in Tanzania
 Koga (crater) on Mars

Other uses
 Koga (surname)
 Kōga-ryū, a school of ninjutsu
 Koga clan, Japanese clan
 KOGA (formerly Koga Miyata), bicycle brand from the Netherlands
 Koga Cycling Team, a defunct Dutch cycling team

Fictional characters
 Koga Gō, a character in the Bleach franchise
 Koga, a Fuchsia City gym leader and Elite Four member in the Pokémon universe
 Koga, a ninja dog clan in the manga and anime Ginga: Nagareboshi Gin
 Koga, the name of the ninja clan that trained Firefly in the G.I. Joe universe
 Koga, the leader of the eastern yōkai-wolf tribe in the Inuyasha series
 , the Japanese name for the manga Basilisk by Masaki Segawa

See also
 Koka (disambiguation)
 Kouga (disambiguation)
 KOGA (disambiguation)